Simin is a Persian feminine given name meaning "silvery" and "white". It is derived from the Middle Persian word asêmên.

Notable people with this given name   
Simin Behbahani, Iranian poet
Simin Keramati, Iranian-born Canadian multidisciplinary artist
Simin Daneshvar, Iranian writer
Simin Davoudi, Iranian academic
Simin Ghanem, Iranian singer
Simin Tander, Afghan-German singer

Persian feminine given names